Torsten Hallman (born 17 October 1939) is a Swedish former professional motocross racer and business entrepreneur. He competed in the Motocross World Championships from 1959 to 1971. A four-time world champion, Hallman led a contingent of Swedish riders that dominated the motocross world championships in the early 1960s. His battles with Belgium's Joël Robert were considered some of the best in the history of the championships. Between 1964 and 1968, the pair finished first or second to one another in the world championship four times.

Hallman played an integral role in the introduction of the sport of motocross in the United States. After his racing career, He established a successful off-road racing apparel company. Hallman was recognized for his influential role in the development of American motocross in 2000 when, he was inducted into the AMA Motorcycle Hall of Fame. In 2012, he was named an FIM Legend for his motorcycling achievements.

Motorcycling career
Born in Uppsala, Sweden, Hallman was part of a group of Swedish riders such as Bill Nilsson, Rolf Tibblin and Sten Lundin who dominated the sport of motocross in the early 1960s. Perhaps one of the best Swedish riders, Hallman competed in the 250cc motocross Grand Prix world championships. His battles with Belgium's Joël Robert were considered some of the best in the history of the championships. Hallman ended his riding career with 37 Grand Prix victories and four 250cc motocross world title for the Swedish Husqvarna factory.

In 1971, Hallman was hired by the Yamaha factory to help them develop new motocross bikes. He was instrumental in Yamaha's decision to purchase the patent for an innovative single shock rear suspension that would eventually be called the monoshock suspension. The suspension design helped Håkan Andersson win the 1973 250cc motocross world championship for Yamaha and would go on to revolutionize the sport.

After his racing career, he began to sell motocross pants and gloves at the races to help supplement his income. Innovative Hallman racing products were available in the mid-1970s via catalogue, and were very popular throughout the United States. This eventually led to the formation of THOR Motocross (Torsten Hallman Original Racewear). THOR grew to become one of the leading off-road racing apparel companies in the world.

In 2000, Hallman was inducted into the AMA Motorcycle Hall of Fame along with Joël Robert.

Motocross Grand Prix Results

European Motocross Championship

Motocross World Championship

References 

1939 births
Living people
Sportspeople from Uppsala
Swedish motocross riders
Date of birth missing (living people)
20th-century Swedish people
21st-century Swedish people